Azkoul is a surname. Notable people with the surname include:

Jad Azkoul, Lebanese teacher and guitarist, son of Karim
Karim Azkoul (born 1915), Lebanese philosopher and diplomat